Olga Freidenberg (March 15, 1890 in Odessa – July 6, 1955 in Leningrad) was a Russian and Soviet classical philologist, one of the pioneers of cultural studies in Russia. She is also known as the cousin of the famous writer Boris Pasternak; their correspondence has been published and studied.

Biography 
Olga Freidenberg was born to Anna Osipovna Pasternak and Mikhail Filippovich Freidenberg in Odessa. The family moved to St Petersburg in 1903 and Freidenberg graduated from a gymnasium there in 1908. Restricted in her ability to pursue university education as a woman and a Jew, she travelled through Europe studying foreign languages on her own and living in Germany, Sweden, Italy, and Switzerland. As World War I broke out, she returned to Russia and became a military nurse.

Freidenberg returned to her studies at Petrograd University in 1923 and wrote a Ph.D. thesis in 1924, titled The Origins of the Greek Novel. The university had only started accepting women as students in 1917, and Freidenberg was the first woman to defend her thesis in classical philology. In 1935 she was awarded the Russian highest scientific degree of Doctor of Science. Since all of the Classics Departments in Russia had been shut since 1921, Freidenberg played a key role in founding the new Classical Department at Petrograd University. Freidenberg also founded the chair of classical philology and was head of the Classical Department from 1932 to 1950.

In her work, Freidenberg drew comparison between pagan erotic novels and both Acts (Apocryphal and Canonical) and Gospels. She defined a narrative genre of ‘Acts and Passions’ of a hero as their common basis. Freidenberg was the first in Europe to conclude that the ‘Greek’ novel was Oriental in its origin. She noted that the archetypal patterns in the plots of its different narratives were versions of the legomenon which can be traced back to the dromenon of fertility cults.

During the Stalin era she was persecuted and her brother was arrested. In 1950, as part of the persecution of "rootless cosmopolitans" she was fired from Petrograd University. For example, Freidenberg's 1935 dissertation The Poetics of Plot and Genre: The Classical Period of Ancient Literature was the only book published in her lifetime (in 1936) but was denounced by the Soviet authorities and taken out of circulation shortly afterwards. It was republished in 1997.

Many of Freidenberg's works were not published in her lifetime and some are still unpublished. Modern scholars, such as Nina Perlina and Nina Braginskaya, are now publishing new editions of Freidenberg's works in English. Freidenberg's work is now being reviewed and reassessed, particularly in examinations of early Greek thought.

Works 

 The Poetics of Plot and Genre: The Classical Period of Ancient Literature
 Image and Concept: Mythopoetic Roots of Literature
 Poėtika si︠u︡zheta i zhanra
 Mif i literatura drevnosti

Further reading 

 
 Nina Perlina, Olga Freidenberg's Works and Days, Slavica Pub 2002, .
 Annette Kabanov, Ol'ga Michajlovna Frejdenberg, 1890-1955: eine sowjetische Wissenschaftlerin zwischen Kanon und Freiheit Wiesbaden: Harrassowitz, 2002

References

External links 
Online archive of Olga Freidenberg's work

1890 births
1955 deaths
People from Kherson Governorate
Odesa Jews
Ukrainian Jews
Soviet philologists
20th-century philologists
Women philologists
Women linguists
Classical philologists
Saint Petersburg State University alumni
Academic staff of Saint Petersburg State University
Russian classical scholars
Women classical scholars
Burials at Bogoslovskoe Cemetery
Academic staff of Herzen University